Cunningham Creek is a creek located in the Cariboo region of British Columbia.  The creek was discovered in 1861 by William Cunningham.  The creek was mined for gold by European and Chinese Miners.

References

Rivers of British Columbia